The Qrn dam is a dam in Saudi Arabia opened in 1988 and located in Taif city of Makkah region.

See also 

 List of dams in Saudi Arabia

References 

Dams in Saudi Arabia